Turkey sent a team to compete at the 1976 Summer Olympics in Montreal, Quebec, Canada. 27 competitors, 26 men and 1 woman, took part in 27 events in 8 sports.

Athletics

Men
Track and road events

Boxing

Men's Light Flyweight (– 48 kg)
 Alican Az
 First Round – Defeated Stephen Muchoki (KEN), walk-over 
 Second Round – Lost to Park Chan-Hee (KOR), 0:5

Cycling

One cyclist represented Turkey in 1976.

Track 

Men

Diving

Judo

Shooting

Weightlifting

Wrestling

References

External links
Official Olympic Reports

Nations at the 1976 Summer Olympics
1976 Summer Olympics
1976 in Turkish sport